In fluid mechanics, the Rayleigh number (after Lord Rayleigh) for a fluid is a dimensionless number associated with buoyancy-driven flow, also known as free (or natural) convection. It characterises the fluid's flow regime: a value in a certain lower range denotes laminar flow; a value in a higher range, turbulent flow. Below a certain critical value, there is no fluid motion and heat transfer is by conduction rather than convection. For most engineering purposes, the Rayleigh number is large, somewhere around 106 to 108.

The Rayleigh number is defined as the product of the Grashof number, which describes the relationship between buoyancy and viscosity within a fluid, and the Prandtl number, which describes the relationship between momentum diffusivity and thermal diffusivity: . Hence it may also be viewed as the ratio of buoyancy and viscosity forces multiplied by the ratio of momentum and thermal diffusivities: . It is closely related to the Nusselt number.

Derivation
The Rayleigh number describes the behaviour of fluids (such as water or air) when the mass density of the fluid is non-uniform. The mass density differences are usually caused by temperature differences. Typically a fluid expands and becomes less dense as it is heated. Gravity causes denser parts of the fluid to sink, which is called convection. Lord Rayleigh studied the case of Rayleigh-Bénard convection. When the Rayleigh number, Ra, is below a critical value for a fluid, there is no flow and heat transfer is purely by conduction; when it exceeds that value, heat is transferred by natural convection.

When the mass density difference is caused by temperature difference, Ra is, by definition, the ratio of the time scale for diffusive thermal transport to the time scale for convective thermal transport at speed :

This means the Rayleigh number is a type of Péclet number. For a volume of fluid of size  in all three dimensions and mass density difference , the force due to gravity is of the order , where  is acceleration due to gravity. From the Stokes equation, when the volume of fluid is sinking, viscous drag is of the order , where  is the dynamic viscosity of the fluid. When these two forces are equated, the speed . Thus the Rayleigh number Ra is

The Rayleigh number can be written as the product of the Grashof number and the Prandtl number:

Classical definition
For free convection near a vertical wall, the Rayleigh number is defined as:

where:
x is the characteristic length
Rax is the Rayleigh number for characteristic length x
g is acceleration due to gravity
β is the thermal expansion coefficient (equals to 1/T, for ideal gases, where T is absolute temperature).
 is the kinematic viscosity
α is the thermal diffusivity
Ts is the surface temperature
T∞ is the quiescent temperature (fluid temperature far from the surface of the object)
Grx is the Grashof number for characteristic length x
Pr is the Prandtl number

In the above, the fluid properties Pr, ν, α and β are evaluated at the film temperature, which is defined as:

For a uniform wall heating flux, the modified Rayleigh number is defined as:

where:
q"o is the uniform surface heat flux
k is the thermal conductivity.

Other applications

Solidifying alloys
The Rayleigh number can also be used as a criterion to predict convectional instabilities, such as A-segregates, in the mushy zone of a solidifying alloy. The mushy zone Rayleigh number is defined as:

where:
K is the mean permeability (of the initial portion of the mush)
L is the characteristic length scale 
α is the thermal diffusivity 
ν is the kinematic viscosity 
R is the solidification or isotherm speed.

A-segregates are predicted to form when the Rayleigh number exceeds a certain critical value. This critical value is independent of the composition of the alloy, and this is the main advantage of the Rayleigh number criterion over other criteria for prediction of convectional instabilities, such as Suzuki criterion.

Torabi Rad et al. showed that for steel alloys the critical Rayleigh number is 17. Pickering et al. explored Torabi Rad's criterion, and further verified its effectiveness. Critical Rayleigh numbers for lead–tin and nickel-based super-alloys were also developed.

Porous media
The Rayleigh number above is for convection in a bulk fluid such as air or water, but convection can also occur when the fluid is inside and fills a porous medium, such as porous rock saturated with water. Then the Rayleigh number, sometimes called the Rayleigh-Darcy number, is different. In a bulk fluid, i.e., not in a porous medium, from the Stokes equation, the falling speed of a domain of size  of liquid . In porous medium, this expression is replaced by that from Darcy's law , with  the permeability of the porous medium. The Rayleigh or Rayleigh-Darcy number is then

This also applies to A-segregates, in the mushy zone of a solidifying alloy.

Geophysical applications
In geophysics, the Rayleigh number is of fundamental importance: it indicates the presence and strength of convection within a fluid body such as the Earth's mantle. The mantle is a solid that behaves as a fluid over geological time scales. The Rayleigh number for the Earth's mantle due to internal heating alone, RaH, is given by:

where:
H is the rate of radiogenic heat production per unit mass
η is the dynamic viscosity
k is the thermal conductivity
D is the depth of the mantle.

A Rayleigh number for bottom heating of the mantle from the core, RaT, can also be defined as:

where:
ΔTsa is the superadiabatic temperature difference between the reference mantle temperature and the core–mantle boundary
CP is the specific heat capacity at constant pressure. 
 
High values for the Earth's mantle indicates that convection within the Earth is vigorous and time-varying, and that convection is responsible for almost all the heat transported from the deep interior to the surface.

See also
 Grashof number
 Prandtl number
 Reynolds number
 Péclet number
 Nusselt number
 Rayleigh–Bénard convection

Notes

References

External links
 Rayleigh number calculator

Convection
Dimensionless numbers of fluid mechanics
Dimensionless numbers of thermodynamics
Fluid dynamics
Dimensionless numbers